Tsaile is a census-designated place (CDP) in Apache County, Arizona, United States, on the Navajo Nation. The population was 1,205 at the 2010 census.

Tsaile is the home of the main campus of Diné College (formerly Navajo Community College), a tribally controlled community college. It has seven other campuses across the Navajo Nation.

Tsaile Public School (Grades K-8) is located in Tsaile. Students attend Chinle High School in Chinle, Arizona, for high school, which is about 25 miles away via Navajo Route 64.

Geography

Demographics

As of the census of 2000, there were 1,078 people, 244 households, and 200 families residing in the CDP. The racial makeup of the CDP was 93.3% Native American, 3.6% White, 0.1% Black or African American, 0.1% Asian, 0.1% Pacific Islander, 0.7% from other races, and 2.1% from two or more races.  1.3% of the population were Hispanic or Latino of any race.

There were 244 households, out of which 55.3% had children under the age of 18 living with them, 50.4% were married couples living together, 27.5% had a female householder with no husband present, and 18.0% were non-families. 16.8% of all households were made up of individuals, and 3.7% had someone living alone who was 65 years of age or older.  The average household size was 3.98 and the average family size was 4.57.

In the CDP, the age distribution of the population shows 38.8% under the age of 18, 19.5% from 18 to 24, 24.1% from 25 to 44, 14.8% from 45 to 64, and 2.8% who were 65 years of age or older.  The median age was 22 years. For every 100 females, there were 88.8 males.  For every 100 females age 18 and over, there were 87.0 males.

The median income for a household in the CDP was $17,500, and the median income for a family was $16,513. Males had a median income of $35,469 versus $21,818 for females. The per capita income for the CDP was $6,259.  About 59.7% of families and 63.2% of the population were below the poverty line, including 72.3% of those under age 18 and 70.0% of those age 65 or over.

Education
The area is served by Chinle Unified School District#24.

Tsaile Elementary School is located in Tsaile. Residents go to schools in Chinle for middle and high school, including Chinle High School.

Tsaile is the home of the main campus of Diné College (formerly Navajo Community College), a tribally controlled community college with seven other campuses across the Navajo Nation.

References

Census-designated places in Apache County, Arizona
Populated places on the Navajo Nation
Census-designated places in Arizona